Voru is a village and jamoat in north-western Tajikistan. It is part of the city of Panjakent in Sughd Region. The jamoat has a total population of 12,347 (2015). It consists of 13 villages, including Rukhnobod (the seat), Voru, Gazza, Gaznich, Guytan, Kuhi, Ven, and Zimtut.

References

Populated places in Sughd Region
Jamoats of Tajikistan